Chondroitinase treatment is a treatment of proteoglycans, a protein in the fluid among cells where (among other things) they affect neural activity (communication, plasticity).  Chondroitinase treatment has been shown to allow adults vision to be restored as far as ocular dominance is concerned. Moreover, there is some evidence that Chondroitinase could be used for the treatment of spinal injuries.

In addition, the enzyme that is used in the chondroitinase treatment, chondroitinase ABC, derives from the bacterium Proteus vulgaris. In recent years, pre-clinical research involving the chondroitinase ABC enzyme has been mainly directed towards utilizing it as a way of treating spinal cord injuries in test animals using viral vectors. In general, the way chondroitinase ABC works in vivo is it cleaves off the side chains of molecules known as chondroitin sulfate proteoglycans (CSPGs) which are over produced by glial cells in the central nervous system when a spinal injury occurs. When chondroitin sulfate proteoglycans are bonded to their side chains called chondroitin sulfate glycosaminoglycans, these molecules are known to prevent neural restoration to the damaged region of the central nervous system because they form glial scar tissue which inhibits both neuroplasticity and repair of damaged axons. However, when the side chains of thechondroitin sulfate proteoglycans are cleaved by chondroitinase ABC, this promotes the damaged region of the CNS to recover from the spinal cord injury.

It has recently been proposed that chondroitinase treatment promotes plasticity by activation of Tropomyosin receptor kinase B, receptor for Brain-derived neurotrophic factor and a major plasticity orchestrator in the brain. Cleavage of CSPGs by chondroitinase ABC leads to inactivation of PTPRS, the membrane receptor for CSPGs and a phosphatase that inactivates TRKB under normal physiological conditions, which subsequently promotes TRKB phosphorylation and activation of neuroplasticity.

See also 
 Neuroplasticity
 Interstitial fluid
 Proteoglycan
 Chondroitin sulfate

References 

Neurology procedures